Elections to Liverpool Town Council were held on Monday 2 November 1868. One third of the council seats were up for election, the term of office of each councillor being three years.

Eight of the sixteen wards were uncontested.

After the election, the composition of the council was:

Election result

Because of the large number of uncontested seats, these statistics should be taken in that context.

Ward results

* - Retiring Councillor seeking re-election

Abercromby

Castle Street

Everton

Exchange

Great George

Lime Street

North Toxteth

Pitt Street

Rodney Street

St. Anne Street

St. Paul's

St. Peter's

Scotland

South Toxteth

Vauxhall

West Derby

Aldermanic Elections

At the meeting of the Council on 9 November 1868, the terms of office of eight 
alderman expired.

The following eight were elected as Aldermen by the Council 
(Aldermen and Councillors) on 9 November 1868 for a term of six years.

* - re-elected aldermen.

By-elections

No. 3, Vauxhall, 

Caused by the election of Councillor Thomas Rigby (Conservative, Vauxhall, elected 1 November 1867) as an Alderman on 9 November 1868.

No. 12, Lime Street, 

Following the death of Councillor William Bottomley Bairstow (Liberal, Lime Street, elected 2nd 
November 1868) which was reported to the Council on 6 January 1869.

No. 5, Exchange, 

The death of alderman Joseph Cooper J.P. Was reported to the Council on 10 February 1869.

Councillor James Tyrer (Conservative, elected for the Exchange ward on 1 November 1867) was elected as an alderman by the Council on 17 February 1869.

No. 15, South Toxteth, 

The death of Councillor William Cowley Miller (Liberal, elected for the South Toxteth ward on 1 November 1866) was reported to the Council on 2 June 1869.

See also

 Liverpool City Council
 Liverpool Town Council elections 1835 - 1879
 Liverpool City Council elections 1880–present
 Mayors and Lord Mayors of Liverpool 1207 to present
 History of local government in England

References

1868
1868 English local elections
November 1868 events
1860s in Liverpool